Šárovcova Lhota is a municipality and village in Jičín District in the Hradec Králové Region of the Czech Republic. It has about 200 inhabitants.

Administrative parts
Villages and hamlets of Bertoldka, Libín and Tikov are administrative parts of Šárovcova Lhota.

References

Villages in Jičín District